Hoze Houndz is a Canadian animated television program which premiered October 4, 1999 on Family Channel. It features six dalmatian dogs (Hozer, Squirt, Steamer, Fontaine, Crystal and Brooke) who work as firefighters in the fictional town of Bonehead Hollow.

Produced by Amberwood Entertainment, with  production, pre-sales and licensing by Alliance Atlantis, each of the 78 half-hour episodes produced consisted of two 11 minute stories with interstitials.

The 2002 episodes "Hockey Night in Bonehead Hollow" and "Phantom in the Arena" featured Ron MacLean and Don Cherry voicing commentators at hockey games, parodying their own real-life roles with Hockey Night in Canada.

Cast 
Rick Jones as Hozer, Squirt
David L. McCallum as Melvin McKie, Duncan McDrool
Norm Berketa as Klock (season 1)
Kevin Tysick as Murry, Smirk, Klock (season 2)
Lianne Picard-Poirier as Crystal, Brooke
Kristen C. Smith as Mole Person, Reporter, The Torch
Anne Lishman as Fontaine (season 1)
Thelma Farmer as Fontaine (season 2)
Timothy Mooney as Bob
Dean Hagopian as Additional Voices
Tori Hammond as Peggy
Dean Hawes as Additional Voices
John Koensgen as Additional Voices
Terrence Scammell as Additional Voices
Kate Hurman as Additional Voices
Brady Moffatt as Additional Voices
Michael O'Reilly as Additional Voices
Debbie Murphy as Additional Voices
Paul Rainville as Additional Voices
Ross Wilson as Additional Voices
Peter Dillon as Additional Voices
John Stocker as Additional Voices
Genevieve Spicer as Additional Voices
Jerri Southcott as Additional Voices
Dave Brown as Additional Voices
Kevin Tysick as Additional Voices

Credits 
Sheldon Wiseman - Executive Producer
Neil Hunter - Creative Producer, Director, Story Editor
Stacey Eberschlag - Director
Chris Butler - Storyboard Supervisor
Dave Brown - Layout Supervisor
Mike Stevens - Posing Supervisor
Derek Bond - Design Supervisor
Peter R. Brown - Overseas Animation Supervisor
Edmund Egan - Music
Michael O'Hara - Layout Artist

Broadcast 
In addition to running on Family Channel in Canada, the show was also broadcast in Spain.

See also
 Dog City
 Road Rovers

References

External links 
 

1990s Canadian animated television series
2000s Canadian animated television series
1999 Canadian television series debuts
2006 Canadian television series endings
Amberwood Entertainment
Animated television series about dogs
Canadian children's animated television series